Rugby sevens – a short form of the sport of rugby union – was first played in 1883, with the first (men's) internationals taking place in 1973. As women's rugby union developed in the 1960s and 1970s the format became very popular as it allowed games, and entire leagues, to be developed in countries even when player numbers were small, and it remains the main form the women's game is played in most parts of the world.

However, although the first Women's international rugby union 15-a-side test match took place in 1982, it was not until 1997 before the first 7-a-side internationals were played, when the Hong Kong Sevens included a women's tournament for the first time.

Over the next decade the number of tournaments grew, with almost every region developing regular championship. This reached its zenith with the first Women's Sevens World Cup in 2009, shortly followed by the announcement that women's rugby sevens will be included in the Olympics from 2016. In 2011/12 the IRB organised three official women's challenges tournaments in Dubai, Hong Kong and London. After the success of these events an annual IRB Women's Sevens World Series was launched from the start of the 2012/13 season.

The following is a list of all women's international tournaments that have been traced since 1997, listed chronologically with the earliest first, with links to result details, where known.  If two tournaments are run concurrently the apparently more senior will be listed first.

Some tournaments include both club and national teams, and these are only included where the majority of teams are International. Occasionally what are effectively national teams play unofficially under an assumed name – these games are also noted where this is known.

The summary section looks at each region in turn and attempts to draw some conclusions about the relative strengths of the participants.  This is a little flawed due to the absence of some results and information as well as the inclusion of non-international teams to make up the numbers but should give the best guess available.

1997

Hong Kong Sevens
15–16 March 1997
Winners: 
Competitors: Arabian Gulf,

1998

Carib International Sevens (Exhibition game)
December 1998
Trinidad & Tobago 12–29 St. Vincent & the Grenadines

YC&AC Invitational Womens Sevens Tournament

March 28nd 1998

Winners New Zealand

Competitors: Japan1 Japan 2, New Zealand, World Invitational team,

1999

Hong Kong Sevens
22–24 March 1999
Winners: 
Competitors: Arabian Gulf, 

YC&AC International Womens Sevens Tournament March 28th 1999   Winners New Zealand  Competitors: Japan 1, Japan 2, New Zealand, World Invitational team, USA, Samoa

2000

Asian Championship
22–24 March 2000. Played as part of the Hong Kong Sevens
Winners: Kazakhstan
Competitors: Arabian Gulf,

Hong Kong Sevens
22–24 March 2000
Winners: 
Competitors: Arabian Gulf, 
YC&AC International Womens Sevens Tournament

April  1th 2000

Winners New Zealand

Competitors: Japan, New Zealand, World Invitational team, USA

Jamaica vs Cayman Islands
Date unknown
Winners: , two matches to nil. Scores unknown.

2001

Asian Championship
28–30 March 2001. Played as part of the Hong Kong Sevens
Winners: 
Competitors: Arabian Gulf,

Hong Kong Sevens
28–30 March 2001
Winners: 
Competitors: Arabian Gulf, 
YC&AC International Womens Sevens Tournament

April  7th 2001

Winners New Zealand

Competitors: Japan, New Zealand, World Invitational team, USA

2002

Whangarei tournament
Venue/Date: Whangarei, New Zealand, 17 February 2002 (Source NZ Rugby, USA Rugby)
 12–12 
  31–5 Invitation
  12–5 
  35–0 Invitation
 19–0 Invitation
  ?-? 
 14–12 United Kawakawa
 41–7 
 10–5 
 0–0 North Harbour
 5–0 NZ Maori 'B' (3rd place match)

Asian Championship
 21–22 March 2002. Played as part of the Hong Kong Sevens
Winners: 
Competitors: Arabian Gulf,

Hong Kong Sevens
 21–22 March 2002
Winner: 
Competitors: Arabian Gulf,

2003

Lomai tournament

 7–0 
 0–21

Whangarei tournament
 are known to have gone on to this tournament before Hong Kong.

Asian Tournament
At Hong Kong, 27 March 2003
Winners: 
Competitors: Arabian Gulf, ;

Hong Kong Sevens
27–28 March 2003
Winners: 
Competitors: Arabian Gulf,

European Tournament
At Lunel, France, 24 May 2003
Winners: 

South Pacific Games
Plans were afoot for a women's sevens tournament but it required six teams.  It is not thought that this was achieved.

2004

CAR North Tournament
At Tunisia, 5–7 March 2004
Winners: Unknown
Competitors: ,  and others

Hong Kong Sevens
At Hong Kong, March 2004
Winner:

South America Tournament
At: Barquisimeto, Venezuela, 20–21 April 2004
Winner:

Rwanda v Burundi
At:Unknown. May 2004
Rwanda 5–0 Burundi

Asian Tournament
At Almaty, Kazakhstan, 15–16 May 2004
Competitors: Arabian Gulf, 
Winner:

European Tournament
At Limoges, France, 21–22 May 2004
Winners: 

Training Tournament (Central Europe)
At Székesfehérvár, Hungary, 26 June 2004
Hungary 36–5 Austria
Other scores not recorded

2005

CAR North Tournament
At Tunisia
Winners: Unknown
Competitors: Unknown

Hong Kong Sevens
At Hong Kong, March 2005
Winner:

Asian Tournament
At Singapore, 15–16 April 2005
Competitors: Arabian Gulf, 
Winner:

European Qualification Tournament
At: Prague, 14–15 May 2005
Winner: 

FIRA Women's European Championship
At: Lunel, France, 25–26 June 2005
Winner: 

CAR African Sevens
Venue/Date: Kampala, 5–6 November 2005
Cancelled for financial reasons

Training Tournament (Central Europe)
Venue/Date: Hungary, 6 November 2005
 24–10 
 10–12 
 played

NAWIRA Tournament
At: Barbados, 19–20 November 2005
Winner: 

South America Tournament
At: São Paulo, Brazil, 19–20 November 2005
Winner:

Valentin Martinez International Tournament
At: Montevideo, Uruguay, date unknown
Winner: 

2006

USA Tournament
Venue: Los Angeles
Winner: 
Participants: ,

Asian Championship
Venue/Date: Taskent, Uzbekistan, 15–16 May
Winner: 
Participants: Arabian Gulf,

CAR North Tournament
At Tunisia
Winners: Unknown
Competitors: Unknown

CAR South Tournament
At Uganda
Winners: Unknown
Competitors: Unknown

Hong Kong Sevens
At Hong Kong, March 2006
Winner:

Emerging European Nations
Venue: Hungary
No results published

FIRA-AER European Championship – Division A
Venue/Date: Limoges, France, 25–27 May 2006
Winner: 

FIRA-AER European Championship – Division B
Venue: Limoges, France, 25–27 May 2006
Winner: 

CAR African Championship
Venue: Kyadondo Rugby Club, Kampala, Uganda
Winner: 

Friendly Games
Date/Venue: 24–25 July 2006, Grossmugl, Austria.  (Source Austria Union)
The only information is that teams from Austria, Hungary, Croatia, Bavaria, and Mugl took part in a men's and women's tournament.

NAWIRA Tournament
Date/Venue: 11–12 November 2006, Garrison Savannah, Barbados. (Source NAWIRA)
Winners: Jamaica

2007

South America Tournament
At: Vina Del Mar, Chile, 12–13 January 2007
Winner:

USA Tournament
At: San Diego, 9–10 February 2007
Winner: 

CAR North Tournament
At Tunia
Winners: 
Competitors: Arabian Gulf,

CAR South Tournament
At Uganda
Winners: Unknown
Competitors: Unknown

T-EN Tournament
Venue: Székesfehérvár, Hungary, 18 March 2007
Winner: 

Hong Kong Sevens
At Hong Kong, March 2007
Competitors: Arabian Gulf, 
Winner:

Asian Championship
At Doha, 27–28 April 2007
Competitors: Arabian Gulf, 
Winner:

Emerging European Nations
Venue: Katowice, Poland
Winner: 

FIRA-AER European Championship – Division B
Venue: Zenica, Bosnia, 19–20 May 2007
Winner: 

FIRA-AER European Championship – Division A
Venue: Zagreb, Croatia, 26–27 May 2007
Winner: 

FIRA-AER European Championship – Top 10
Venue: Lunel, France, 2–3 June 2007
Winner: 

CAR African Championship
Venue: Kyadondo Rugby Club, Kampala, Uganda
Winner: 

T-EN League
Venue: Grossmugl, Austria, 23 June 2007
Winner: 

South East Asia Sevens
Venue: Singapore, 6 October 2007.
Winner: 

Borneo Sevens
Venue: Borneo, 2 and 3 November 2007.
Results unknown

NAWIRA Tournament
At: Winton Rugby Centre, Nassau, Bahamas, 17–18 November 2007
Winner: 

Pacific Tournament
At: Port Moresby, Papua New Guinea
Winner: 

Dubai Tournament
At: Dubai, 1–2 December 2007
Results not published.

South East Asia Games
Venue: Sursnaree, Thailand, 9–11 December 2007
Winner: 
Thailand 52–0 Cambodia
Laos 0–36 Singapore
Thailand 14–12 Singapore
Cambodia 0–20 Laos
Cambodia 0–29 Singapore
Thailand 52–0 Laos

Classification Stages
Semi Finals
Thailand 43–0 Cambodia
Singapore 27–0 Laos

3rd/4th Match (bronze medal)
Cambodia 0–15 Laos
Final (gold and silver medal)
Thailand 19–5 Singapore

2008

South American Tournament and World Cup Qualifier
At: Punta del Este, Uruguay, 18–19 January 2008
Winner:

USA Sevens
At: San Diego, 9–10 February 2008
Winner: 

Emerging European Nations
Venue: Austria, 21–24 March 2008
Winner: 

Hong Kong Sevens
At: Hong Kong, 27–28 March 2008
Competitors: Arabian Gulf, 
Winner:

World Cup Pre-Qualifier (Europe)
Venue: Bosnia
Winner: . Also qualified: , 

Amsterdam Sevens 2008
At: Amsterdam, 17–18 May 2008.
Winner:

London IRB (Men's) Sevens 2008 (Exhibition game)
At: Twickenham 25 May 2008, (during men's IRB sevens).
 14–10

World Cup Pre-Qualifier (Europe)
Venue: Belgium, 30 – May 2008
Winner: . Also qualified: , .  added as best fourth place (over Bulgaria), following withdrawal of Scotland.

Home Nations Cup 2008
At: Edinburgh 1 June 2008.
Winner: 
Only the results of games involving England were published.
 ??-?? 
 42–5 
 12–19 
 31–10 
 ??-?? 
 0–24

One Off Match – Zambia 2008
At: Kitwe, Zambia, 31 May 2008.
 36–0

Madrid Sevens – 2008
At: Madrid 7 June 2008
 Final  17–10

FIRA AER Top 16 and World Cup Qualifier
Venue: Limoges, France 14–15 June 2008
Winner: 
Scotland withdrew a week before the tournament was played.

International Tournament – Reunion 2008
At: Réunion 23 to 30 June
Mauritius were planned to take part but appear to have dropped out.

 31–0 
 43–0 
 75–0 
 45–0 
 37–0 
 0–66 
 0–76 
 5–5 
 5–26 
 15–0

Oceania World Cup Qualifier
At: Samoa, 25–26 July 2008
Winner: .  also qualified.

T-EN Central European Tournament
At: Rauris, Austria, 19 September 2008
Winner: 

African World Cup Qualifier
Venue: Kyadondo Rugby Club, Kampala, Uganda
Winner: 

Asian World Cup Qualifier
At: Hong Kong, 4–5 October 2008
Winner: 
Competitors: Arabian Gulf,

T-EN Central European Tournament
Venue: Slovenia, 19 October 2008
Winner: 

North America/Caribbean World Cup Qualifier
At: Nassau, Bahamas, 25–26 October 2008
Winner: 

Friendly Sevens at Brno 2008
At Brno, Czech Republic. 2 November 2008
 are thought to have participated.

Japan Demonstration Game 2008
22 November 2008, Japan. Not strictly an International, this was a game played amongst Japan squad members prior to the men's Japan USA XV aside match.
Reds 12–12 Whites

Asian Development Tournament
Laos, 26 to 29 November 2008
No scores published

Dubai Tournament
At Dubai, 27–29 November 2008. A tournament "for women’s teams who play rugby regularly at an international/county/provincial standard". The official status of some teams is unclear. England played as "Sporting Chance Foundation".
Winner: 

Nelson Mandela Bay Tournament 2008
Venue: Port Elizabeth, South Africa, 13–14 December 2008
Final  36–0

FIRA Warm Up Tournament 2008
Venue:Montpellier, France 20–21 December 2008
Group Game: France 12–0 Spain
Final: France 19–7 Spain

2009

Rwanda Burundi Festival 2009
At Burundi, January 2009.
No details are known.
Participants: ,

South American Tournament
At: Mar del Plata, Argentina, 24–25 January 2009
Winner:

USA Sevens

Málaga Sevens 2009 
At: Málaga 14–15 February 2009
Some international sides used this tournament as a warm up for Dubai and the following are results.
 36–0 Andalucia
 33–0 
 26–7 
 24–0 Andalucia
 22–0 Andalucia
 24–14 
Semi Final:  41–0 Andalucia
Semi Final:  14–17 
3rd Place:  49–0 Andalucia
Final:  12–19

Minor Nations Training 2009
At London, 19–22 February 2009.
Finland (two teams) and Austria trained at London Wasps and this was followed by a tournament involving Finland, Finland 2, Austria, Wasps, Wasps 2 and Metropolitan Police.
Finland won all their games in a limited round robin (all teams played four games).
Group Games: Austria 0–36 Finland
Group Games: Finland 2 5–17 Austria
Plate Final: Finland 2 17–5 Austria
Cup Final: Finland 38–0 Wasps 2

IRB Sevens World Cup
At: Dubai, 5–7 March 2009
Winner: 

F-EN (Central European) Tournament
Venue: Ljublana, Serbia, 7 March 2009
Winner: .

F-EN (Central European) League
Venue: Zagreb, Croatia, 21 March 2009
Results not published

Hong Kong Sevens
At: Hong Kong, 27 March 2009
Competitors: Arabian Gulf, 
Winner:

Europe Emerging Nations
At: Zanka, Hungary, 12 April 2009
Winner: 

Asian Championship
At: Bangkok, Thailand, 30 May 2009
Competitors: Arabian Gulf, 
Winner:

CAR North West
Venue: Accra, Ghana
Winner: 

FIRA-AER European Tournament – Division B
At: Zenica, Bosnia
Winner: 

Roma Sevens 2009
Venue: Rome, Italy, 5 & 6 June 2009
Winner: Samurai Ladies International (UK)
Participants: Wooden Spoon, The Bassets Ladies, Murrayfields Wanderers RFC

Reunion Tournament 2009
At: Réunion 20 June 2009
Participants: Winners , runners up , third , unknown , 

France results:
Réunion 0–36 France
France 26–0 Madagascar
France 61–0 Mayotte
France 19–7 Pretoria University

F-EN (Central Europe) Finals
At: Vienna, Austria 27–28 June
No results published

FIRA-AER European Tournament – Division A
At: Bruges. Belgium
Winner: 

FIRA-AER European Tournament – Top 10
At: Hanover, Germany
Winner: 

Banc ABC Tournament, Zimbabwe
At Harare, Zimbabwe 12 September 2009
 12–24 
Final placings are believed to have been 1st, Zambia, 2nd, Zimbabwe, 3rd, Zambia B, 4th, Zimbabwe B

Shanghai Sevens 2009
At: Shanghai, China 12 and 13 September 2009
Participants: , 
Results unknown

Pacific Mini Games

CAR African Tournament
Cancelled

Borneo Sevens 2009
At: Borneo. 31 October
Guam were mooted as a participant.
Thailand 39–0 India
Thailand 52–0 Malaysia
India 21–10 Malaysia

Bangkok Sevens 2009
At: Bangkok, Thailand 31 October. Thai club sides predominated.
Kazakhstan 20–14 Arabian Gulf

NACRA Caribbean Tournament
At:Mexico City
Winner: 

Dubai Tournament
At: Dubai, 4 December 2009. A tournament "for women’s teams who play rugby regularly at an international/county/provincial standard". The official status of some teams is unclear.
Participants: 12 teams, including five official national selections – Arabian Gulf,

East Asian Games 2009
At: Hong Kong 5 December 2009,
Group Games
China 24–0 Japan
Guam 12–10 Hong Kong
Japan 50–0 Guam
China 44–0 Hong Kong
China 46–0 Guam
Japan 7–5 Hong Kong
Classification Stages

Semi Final
China 20–5 Hong Kong
Japan 19–5 Guam
Plate Final
Hong Kong 15–0 Guam
Final
China 34–12 Japan

European Emerging Nations
At: Slovenia 26 September 2009
Winner:

2010

South American Games
Venue: Mar del Plata, Argentina. 5 – 6–7 January 2010
Winner: 

USA Tournament
Venue: Las Vegas. 12 February 2010
Winner: 

European Emerging Nations
At: Ljubjana 21 March 2010
Winner:

Hong Kong Sevens
At: Hong Kong, 26–27 March 2010
Winner:

Emerging Nations Camp
At: Zanka, Hungary, 4 April 2010
Winner:

F-EN League
At: Székesfehervár, Hungary, 26 April 2010
Winner:

St Lucia v Guadeloupe
Venue: Castries Comprehensive Secondary School (CCSS) Ground. 8 May 2010
Matches were of thirty minutes duration with a five minutes half time break.
 69–5 
 47–5

FIRA-AER European Tournament – Division A
Venue: Bucharest, Romania. 22–23 May 2010
Winner: 

FIRA-AER European Tournament – Division B
Venue: Odense, Denmark. 22–23 May 2010
Winner: 

Amsterdam Sevens
Venue/Date: Amsterdam, Netherlands 22–23 May 2010
Winner:

CAR North West
Venue: Ouagadougou, Burkina Faso, 28 & 29 May 2010.
Winner: 

Roma Sevens 2010
Venue: Rome, Italy, 3 & 4 June 2010
Winner: 

Carcassonne Sevens
Venue: Carcassonne, Italy. 19–20 June 2010.
There was only 3 national sides (Portugal, Georgia and Bulgaria) – but Portugal were on a much higher level. The teams agreed to form the Barbarians Filles between Bulgaria and Georgia to be able to play Portugal.
 63–0 
 46–7 
Final:  66–0 Barbarians Fillies

FIRA-AER European Tournament – Top 10
Venue: Moscow, Russia. 10–11 July 2010
Winner: 

Asian Championship
Venue: Guangzhou, China. 24–25 July 2010
Winner: 

NACRA Sevens Championship
Venue: Georgetown, Guyana. 26–27 July 2010
Winner: 

Cortina Sevens
Venue: Cortina d'Ampezzo, Italy. 31 July – 1 August 2010
Matches included:
 10–0 
 33–0 
Valsugana (ITA) 3–10

Castle Sevens
Venue: Lusaka, Zambia. 28–29 August 2010
Winner: 
Pool: 17–10 
Pool:  5–20 
Final:  14–12 
[Other results not published]

Friendly Cup (Coupe de l'Amitié)
Venue: Lviv, Ukraine, 2 October 2010
Winner: 
Participants: 1st ; 2nd ; 3rd ; 4 ; 5th ; 6th ; 7th ; 8th 
Some details have now emerged:
Pool 1 positions
 Ukraine I
 Romania
 Lithiania
 Lviv regional team

Pool 2 positions
 Moldova
 Hungary
 Poland
 Ukraine II
Hungarian results:
 Hungary 46–0 Poland
 Moldova 29–0 Hungary
 Ukraine II 0–41 Hungary
 Romania 17–5 Hungary

Asia Pacific Sevens
Venue: Kota Kinabalu, Borneo, 29–31 October 2010
Winner: 

BancABC Sevens
Venue: Harare Sports Club, Zimbabwe
Winner: 
Final:  24–19 
Other results unpublished

Singapore Sevens
Venue: Singapore Cricket Club, 5–6 November 2010
Winner: 
Group A
 7–12 
 beat 
 0–29 

Play-offs
 20–0 
 beat Group B
 27–0 
 lost to 
 60–0 

Semi finals
 0–36 
 17–12 

Plate Final
 19–7 

Final
 0–14

Asian Games
Venue: Guangzhou, China, 21–23 November 2010
Winner: 

Malta v Tunisia
Venue: Unknown, 10 November 2010
 5–19

F-EN League
At: Various, September – November 2010
Winner:

Dubai Sevens
At: Dubai, 2–3 December 2010. A tournament "for women’s teams who play rugby regularly at an international/county/provincial standard". The official status of some teams is unclear.

2011

South American Championship
Venue: Bento Gonçalves, Rio Grande do Sul, Brazil. 5–6–7 February 2011
Winner: 

USA Tournament
Venue: Las Vegas. 11–13 February 2011
Winner: 

Hong Kong Sevens
Venue: Hong Kong. 25 March 2011
Winner: 

CAR North
Venue: Senegal, 23–24 April 2011.
Winner: 

F-EN League
At: Zagreb, 9 April 2011
Winner:

Emerging Nations Camp
At: Zanka, Hungary, 23–24 April 2011
Winner:

St Lucia v Guadeloupe
At Corinth Playing Field, St Lucia
St.Lucia 28–10 Guadeloupe
St.Lucia 40–0 Guadeloupe

F-EN League
At: Vienna, 19 May 2011
Competitors: , 
Winner: Not known

Amsterdam Sevens
Venue: Amsterdam, 21–22 May 2011.
Winner: 

Portugal v Brazil
Venue: National Stadium, Lisbon, 25 May 2011
Portugal 24–5 Brazil

Roma Sevens
Venue: Rome, 3–4 June 2011.
Winner:
Participants:, Kusa

ScrumQueens.com Elite Sevens
Venue: Richmond, London. 4 June 2011
Winner: Wooden Spoon
Pool A
England 33–5 Pink Baa-Baas
England 35–0 Saracens
England 0–22 Wooden Spoons
Pool B
Sweden 19–10 Worcester
Richmond 5–10 Sweden
Akuma Dragons 5–19 Sweden
Semi-final
England 27–0 Sweden
Final
England 7–14 Wooden Spoons

FIRA-AER European Tournament – Division 3
Venue: 4–5 June 2011, Zanka, Hungary
Winner: 

La Réunion Sevens
Venue La Réunion, 25–26 June 2011
Winner: 
Pool A
France 45–0 Réunion
Tukkies 41–0 New Caledonia
France 24–7 New Caledonia
Tukkies 36–0 Réunion
New Caledonia 26–17 Réunion
France 7–24 Tukkies
Pool B
Uganda 67–0 Mayotte
Marine 5–0 Madagascar
Uganda 17–7 Madagascar
Marine 34–0 Mayotte
Madagascar 55–0 Mayotte
Uganda 38–0 Marine
Plate semi-finals
New Caledonia 47–0 Mayotte
Madagascar 30–0 Réunion
Plate final
Madagascar 62–7 New Caledonia
Semi-finals
Tukkies 14–0 Marine
France 17–14 Uganda
Final
Tukkies 12–10 France

FIRA-AER European Tournament – Division 2
Venue: 2–3 July 2011, Riga, Latvia
Winner: 

FIRA-AER Tournament 2010 – Top 12
Venue: 16–17 July 2011, Bucharest, Romania
Winner: 

Prague Sevens
Venue: Prague, 13–14 August 2011
Winner: Eccose Feminin (Int)
Participants: Eccose Feminin (Int), RK Petrovice (CZ), Lazybugs (CZ)
Only international fixture:  7–31

Shanghai Sevens
Venue: Shanghai, 27–28 August 2011.
Winner: 
Pool
China 24–0 Hong Kong
Kazakhstan 31–10 Thailand
China 26–7 Thailand
Kazakhstan 17–5 Hong Kong
China 31–10 Kazakhstan
Thailand 24–5 Hong Kong
Semi-finals
China 34–0 Hong Kong
Kazakhstan 7–0 Thailand
Third place
Thailand 14–10 Hong Kong
Final
China 19–10 Kazakhstan

Castle Sevens
Venue: Lusaka, 27–28 August 2011
Winner:
Pool
Zambia A 14 – 12 Botswana
Zambia B 0 – 50 Zimbabwe
Zambia A 14 – 19 Zimbabwe
Botswana 29 – 0 Zambia B
Zambia A 50 – 0 Zambia B
Botswana lost to Zimbabwe
Final
Zambia A 12–7 Zimbabwe

Pacific Games
Venue: New Caledonia, 30–31 August 2011.
Winner: 

Piotrowice Nyskie International Rugby Festival
Venue: Piotrowice Nyskie, 3–4 September 2011
Known results:
Czech Rep. 19–5 Poland A
Czech Rep. 7–17 Poland B
Czech Rep. 5–24 Romania
Czech Rep. 5–17 Gdańsk
Friendly matches (outside tournament): Czech Rep. 21–5 Romania. Czech also beat Poland A and Poland B (scores unknown)

Asia Pacific Sevens
Venue: Kota Kinabalu, Borneo, 23–25 September 2011
Winner: 

Asian Championship
Venue: Pune, India. 1–2 October 2011
Winner: 

Friendly Cup (Coupe de l'Amitié)
Venue: Lviv, Ukraine, 1 October 2010
Winner: 
Participants: 1st ; 2nd ; 3rd , 4th , 5th , 6th . Also participated: 
Only limited details available:
Ukraine beat Moldova
Ukraine beat Poland
Ukraine Clubs 19–0 Hungary
Gallícia 5–10 Hungary
Ukraine 61–0 Hungary
Moldova 5–12 Hungary

CAR South
Venue: Botswana, 29–30 October 2011.
Winner: 

Torneo Internacional de Elche
Venue: Elche, Spain 1 November 2011.
Winner: 
Pool
Spain 12–12 France
Netherlands 35–7 Portugal
Spain 12–10 Netherlands
France 21–7 Portugal
Netherlands 17–0 France
Spain 21–10 Portugal

3rd/4th
France 14–0 Portugal

Final
Spain 26–10 Netherlands

Singapore Cricket Club International Rugby 7s Tournament
Venue: Singapore 4–5 November 2011.
Winner: 
Pool matches
Singapore 21–0 Malaysia
Singapore 21–0 Singapore Barbarians
Singapore 41–0 Indonesia
Singapore Barbarians 22–0 Malaysia
Singapore Barbarians 17–0 Indonesia
Indonesia 0–0 Malaysia
Semi-Finals
Singapore 55–0 Indonesia
Singapore Barbarians 10–5 Malaysia (or 12–5?)
3rd Place (Plate)
Malaysia 7–5 Indonesia

Final
Singapore 33–0 Singapore Barbarians

Safaricom Sevens
Venue: Nyayo National Stadium, Kenya 5–6 November 2011.
Winner: 
Kenya 24–0 Uganda B
Uganda 29–0 Kenya B
Kenya 41–5 Kenya B
Uganda 45–0 Uganda B
Uganda B 27–5 Kenya B
Kenya 10–10 Uganda
Final
Kenya 7–5 Uganda

NACRA Sevens Championship
Venue: Bridgetown, Barbados. 12–13 November 2011
Winner: 

IRB Women's Sevens Challenge Cup
Venue: Dubai, UAE. 2–3 December 2011
Winner: 

Dubai Women's International Inivitational
Venue: Dubai, UAE. 2–3 December 2011
Winner: 

2012

Spain v Netherlands
Venue: Madrid, 17–18 January 2012
Six matches over two days, all won by Spain.
Known results: Spain 21–17 Netherlands; Spain 33–5 Netherlands; Spain 20–5 Netherlands

Martinique Sevens
Venue: Martinique, 4 February 2012
Two separate tournaments:
Tournoi Guyane-Antilles
Full results not published. In the final Guadeloupe beat French Guiana in sudden death overtime after a 5–5 draw. Martinique also took part.

International women's tournament:
Result: 1. France B; 2. France A; 3. Trinidad & Tobago; 4. Saint Lucia
France A 43–0 Saint Lucia
France B 36–0 Trinidad & Tobago
France A 31–0 Trinidad & Tobago
France B 31–0 Saint Lucia
Trinidad & Tobago w/o Saint Lucia (Saint Lucia forfeit)
France B 24–19 France A

USA Tournament
Venue: Las Vegas. 11–12 February 2012
Winner: 

Portugal v Spain
Venue: Lisbon, 29 February 2012
Portugal 0 Spain 38; Portugal 0 Spain 31; Portugal 0 Spain 19; Portugal 0 Spain 22; Portugal 5 Spain 25

Netherlands in Botswana & South Africa
Venue: Port Elizabeth, 5–19 March 2012
Known results: South Africa 7, Netherlands 28

Swiss International tournament
Venue: Allmend, Lucerne, 10–11 March 2012
Results:
Day one
France II 36–0 Germany
Switzerland 0–36 France
Germany 0–52 France
France II 33–0 Switzerland
Switzerland 7–36 Germany
France 14–12 France II
Day two
France 12–14 France II
Switzerland 0–43 France
France II 10–7 Germany
France 50–7 Germany
France II 33–5 Switzerland
Switzerland 7–24 Germany

South American Championship
Venue: Rio de Janeiro, Brazil. 10–11 March 2012
Winner: 

IRB Women's Challenge (Hong Kong)
Venue: Hong Kong. 23–24 March 2012
Winner: 

European Emerging Nations
Venue: Zanka, Hungary. 8–9 April 2012
Winner: 
Participants: , Barbarians,

St Lucia triangular
Venue: Gros Islet Playing Field, St Lucia 28 April 2012
St Lucia 55 – 0 Curaçao
St Lucia 38 – 0 Curaçao
Barbados 15 – 5 Curaçao
Barbados 10 – 5 Curaçao

IRB Challenge: London Sevens
Venue: Twickenham, London 12–13 May 2012
Winner: England

Roma Sevens
Venue: Rome, 18–19 May 2012.
Winner:
Participants:, Tukkies,

Amsterdam Sevens
Venue: Amsterdam, 19–20 May 2012.

Silver Pier
Winner: 

Women's shield
Winner: 

Benidorm Sevens
Venue: Benidorm, Spain. 25–26 May 2012
Winner:

Spain 26–0 Kazakhstan
Spain 15–17 Russia
Russia beat Kazakhstan

Spain 24–0 Kazakhstan
Spain 17–20 Russia
Russia beat Kazakhstan

Spain 24–14 Kazakhstan
Russia 26–10 Kazakhstan
Spain 26–10 Russia
Final: Spain 19–10 Russia

European World Cup Qualifier: Group A
Venue: Sofia, Bulgaria. 9–10 June 2012
Winner:

European World Cup Qualifier: Group B
Venue: Gent, Belgium. 9–10 June 2012
Winner:

European Women's Sevens Series: Round 1
Venue: Ameland, Netherlands. 16–17 June 2012
Winner: 

European Women's Sevens Series: Round 2 and WC Qualifier
Venue: Moscow. 30 – June 2012
Winner: 

Harare Sevens
At: Harare, Zimbabwe, 28 July 2012
Zimbabwe A 0–47 Zambia
Zimbabwe 15–12 Zambia

Oceania World Cup Qualifier
At: Fiji, 3–4 August 2012
Winner: .

Prague Sevens
Venue: Prague, 11–12 August 2012
Only international: Austria 19–12 Czech Republic

Piotrowice Nyskie International Rugby Festival
Venue: Piotrowice Nyskie, 25–26 August 2012 (Source: FIRA)
Winner: 
Participants ,  plus club teams.
No international fixtures. Austria finished third.

NACRA World Cup Qualifier
At: Ottawa, 25–26 August 2012
Winner: 

Asia Pacific Sevens
Venue: Kota Kinabalu, Borneo, 31 – August 2012
Winner: 

Shanghai Sevens
Venue: Shanghai, China, 22–23 September 2012
Winner: 
International results:
China 31–0 Hong Kong
China 38–0 Singapore
Hong Kong 29–0 Singapore
(Final): China 31–0 Hong Kong

Safari Sevens 2012
Venue: Middelburg, South Africa
Winner: 
International results:
Botswana 5–15 Zimbabwe

African World Cup Qualifier
Venue: Rabat, Morocco, 29–30 September 2012
Winner: 

Asian World Cup Qualifier
Venue: Pune, India, 6–7 October 2012
Winner: 

Tournoi International rugby 7 féminin
Venue: Marcoussis, Paris, 12–13 October 2012

Germany 0–40 France A
England 22–5 Spain
France 5–17 Netherlands
England 19–5 France A
Germany 7–26 Netherlands
Spain 0–14 France
England 24–5 Netherlands
Spain 14–7 France A
Germany 0–31 France
Netherlands 12–14 Spain
England 42–0 Germany
France A 0–20 France
Germany 0–24 Spain
France A 5–12 Netherlands
England 21–5 France
Bowl
France A 26–5 Germany

Plate
Netherlands 14–12 Spain

Cup
England 19–14 France

Guangzhou Sevens
Venue: Guangzhou, China 27–28 October 2012
Winner: 
Group A
China 53–0 Philippines
Singapore	0	–	59	USA
China	53	–	0	Singapore
Philippines	0	–	52	USA
China	5	–	36	USA
Philippines	24	–	5	Singapore

Quarter-finals
USA 45–0 Thailand
Kazakhstan beat Philippines
South Africa beat Singapore
China 7–10 China II

Plate Semi-finals
Philippines 24–0 Thailand
China 60–0 Singapore

Semi finals
USA 33–7 Kazakhstan
South Africa 29–7 China IIGroup B
Kazakhstan	48	–	0	Thailand
China II 7–33	South Africa
Kazakh-stan	17	–	0	China II
Thailand	0	–	53	South Africa
Kazakhstan	10	–	28	South Africa
Thailand	0	–	54	China II

7th–8th place
Thailand 26–5 Singapore

Plate final (5th–6th)
China 62–0 Philippines

3rd–4th place
Kazakhstan 12–0 China II

Final
USA 24–0 South Africa

Valencia Sevens
Venue: Valencia, Spain
Spain 17–12 Russia
Spain 27–0 Russia
Spain 21–15 Russia

IRB Women's Sevens World Series
Venue: Dubai, UAE. 30 – November 2012
Winner: 

Dubai Sevens Women's Invitational Tournament
Venue: Dubai, UAE. 29 – November 2012
Winner: 
Participants: ; ; ;

Seven de la Republica
Venue: Paranà, Argentina. 29 – November 2012
Final classification: 1 Argentina, 2 Uruguay, 3 Chile, 4 Paraguay
Argentina 17–5 Chile
Uruguay 31–0 Paraguay
Argentina 41–0 Paraguay
Uruguay 25–0 Chile
Chile 12–10 Paraguay
Argentina 19–5 Uruguay

Havana Sevens
Venue: Havana, Cuba. 29 – November 2012
Winner: 
No results known. Cuba beaten in the final.

Guatemala exhibition
Venue: Guatemala. 1 December 2012
Guatemala 5–10 Costa Rica B
Costa Rica A 29–0 El Salvador
Costa Rica A 33–0 Guatemala
Costa Rica B 27–0 El Salvador
Guatemala 10–5 El Salvador

2013

Women's Sevens World Series (USA)
Venue: BBVA Compass Stadium, Houston. 1–2 February 2013
Winner: 

Spain v France
Venue: Gijón 2–3 February 2013
A joint training camp, with two internationals being played:
Spain 19–22 France
Spain 26–22 France

USA Sevens
Venue: Las Vegas. 8–9 February 2013
Winner: 

South American Championship and World Cup qualifier
Venue: Rio de Janeiro, Brazil. 23–24 February 2013
Winner:

Alicante Sevens
Venue: Alicante, Spain. 14 March 2013
Group A
France 12–0 Germany
Germany 7–17 Russia A
France 12–5 Russia A.

Semi-finals
France 24–10 Russia B
Spain 0–29 Russia A

5th/6th place
Germany 31–0 TunisiaGroup B
Spain 26–5 Tunisia
Russia B 32–5 Tunisia
Russia B 17–0 Spain

3rd/4th place
Russia B 0–43 Spain

Final
France 7–38 Russia A

Hong Kong
Venue: Hong Kong. 22 March 2013
Winner: 

IRB Women's Sevens World Series: China
Venue: Guangzhou University City Stadium, Guangzhou, China 30–31 March 2013
Winner: New Zealand

African Sevens
Venue: Tunis. 20–21 April 2013
Winner: 

London Sevens
Venue: Twickenham 11–12 May 2013
Winner: 

Amsterdam Sevens
IRB Women's Sevens World Series
Venue: NRCA Stadium, Amsterdam, 17–18 May 2013.
Winner: 

Women's Shield
Venue: NRCA Stadium, Amsterdam, 18–19 May 2013.
Winner: 

European Championship: Group B
Venue: Bratislava. 25–26 May 2013
Winner: 

European Championship Series: Top 12, Round 1
Venue: Brive. 1–2 June 2013
Winner: 

European Championship: Group A
Venue: Prague. 8–9 June 2013
Winner: 

European Championship Series: Top 12, Round 2
Venue: Marbella. 15–16 June 2013
Winner: 

IRB Sevens World Cup
At: Moscow, 28–29 June 2013
Winner: 

Asian Championship Round 1
At: Baeng Sen, Thailand, 20–21 September 2013
Winner: 

Middelburg Sevens
At Middelburg, South Africa
Winner: 
Mainly club teams. Only internationals:
Botswana 0–29 Zimbabwe
Botswana 5–17 Zimbabwe

Belgium v Netherlands
5 October 2013
Three training games, all won by Netherlands

Oceania Championship
At: Noose, Australia 5–6 October 2013
Winner: .

Germany v Netherlands
12 October 2013
Four training games:
Netherlands 50–0 Germany
Netherlands 12–5 Germany
Netherlands 27–0 Germany
Netherlands 12–0 Germany

Asian Championship Round 2
At: Pune, India, 9–10 November 2013
Winner: 

Valentine Martinez
Venue: Montevideo, Uruguay. 9–10 November 2013
Winner: 

NACRA Championship
At: Ottawa, 25–26 August 2012
Winner: 

Souston Sevens
At Souston, France, 10 November 2013

POOL 1

England 21–0 French Universities
Netherlands A 5–12 Germany
England 38–0 Germany
Netherlands A 0–33 French Universities
England 17–0 Netherlands A
Germany 0–45 French Universities

7th Place
Netherlands A 40–0 Tunisia

5th Place
Germany 0–33 Ireland
POOL 2

France 22–0 Tunisia
Ireland 0–24 Netherlands 1
France 26–7 Netherlands 1
Ireland 31–0 Tunisia
France 22–7 Ireland
Netherlands 1 47–5 Tunisia

3rd Place
French Universities 0–12 Netherlands 1

Final
France 29–17 England

Bolivarian Games
Venue: Chiclayo, Peru. 15–17 November 2013
Winner: 

IRB Women's Sevens World Series
Venue: Dubai, UAE. 28–29 November 2013
Winner: 

2014

Mar del Plata Sevens
Venue: Mar del Plata, Argentina, 11–12 January 2014

Uruguay 14–5 Paraguay
Argentina 22–5 Chile
Uruguay 38–0 Chile
Argentina 17–5 Paraguay
Chile 15–12 Paraguay
Argentina 32–0 Uruguay
Argentina 22–0 Paraguay (Semi-Final)
Uruguay 22–0 Chile (Semi-Final)
Paraguay 10–5 Chile (3rd Place Match)
Argentina 38–0 Uruguay (Final)

Copa Mesoamericana
Venue: Guatemala, 25 January 2014
Guatemala 'B' 0–33 Jalisco (Mexico)
Guatemala 12–5 El Salvador
Guatemala 20–7 Jalisco (Mexico)
Guatemala 'B' 0–36 El Salvador
Guatemala 41–0 Guatemala 'B'
El Salvador 10–0 Jalisco (Mexico)

Rainforest Sevens
Venue: Cartago, Costa Rica

Venezuela 46 – El Salvador 7
Peru 43 – Panamá 0
Nicarágua 0 – Costa Rica 50
Venezuela 17 – Peru 22
Colômbia 52 – El Salvador 7
Panamá 0 – Costa Rica 54
Venezuela 54 – Panamá 0
Peru 45 – Nicarágua 0
Colômbia 24 – Costa Rica 0
Nicarágua 20 – Panamá 0
Costa Rica 26 – El Salvador 5
Colômbia 27 – Peru 5
Nicarágua 0 – Venezuela 72
Colômbia 50 – Panamá 0
El Salvador 0 – Peru 41
Costa Rica 0 – Venezuela 27
Colômbia 82 – Nicaragua 0
Panamá 0 – El Salvador 20
Costa Rica 5 – Peru 34
Colômbia 17 – Venezuela 0
El Salvador 19 – Nicarágua 5

Final Standing
1 – Colômbia – qualified for Central American and Caribbean Games – Veracruz 2014
2 – Peru (invited)
3 – Venezuela – qualified for Central American and Caribbean Games – Veracruz 2014
4 – Costa Rica
5 – El Salvador
6 – Nicarágua
7 – Panamá

Women's Sevens World Series (USA)
Venue: Fifth Third Bank Stadium, Kennesaw, Georgia. 15–16 February 2014
Winner: 

Women's Sevens World Series (Brazil)
Venue: São Paulo. 21–22 February 2014
Winner: 

Athens Sevens
Venue: Athens, 23–24 March 2014
Winner: 

Israel 24–5 Malta
Greece 0–41 Russia
Bulgaria 5–26 Romania
Israel 26–0 Greece
Malta 22–10 Bulgaria
Russia 22–0 Romania
Greece 5–36 Bulgaria
Malta 0–17 Romania
Israel 0–35 Russia
Greece 0–48 Romania
Malta 0–35 Russia
Israel 24–7 Bulgaria
Malta 43–0 Greece
Israel 5–17 Romania
Bulgaria 0–45 Russia

Semi-finals
Russia 45–0 Israel
Romania 24–7 Malta
5th/6th place
Bulgaria 19–7 Greece
3rd/4th place
Israel 7–12 Malta (AET)
Final
Russia 39–5 Romania

Hong Kong
Venue: Hong Kong. 28 March 2014
Winner: 

IRB Women's Sevens World Series: China
Venue: Guangzhou University City Stadium, Guangzhou, China 5–6 April2013
Winner: 

African Sevens
Venue: 12 April 2014. Machakos, Kenya
Winner: 

Stanislas Sevens
Venue: 10–11 May 2014. Meurthe-et-Moselle, France
Winner: Brazil development
Internationals: Czech Republic 36–5 Georgia; Brazil Development 55–0 Belgium; Czech Republic 22–5 Switzerland; Switzerland 14–5 Georgia

Amsterdam Sevens
IRB Women's Sevens World Series
Venue: NRCA Stadium, Amsterdam, 16–17 May 2014.
Winner: 

Women's Shield
Venue: NRCA Stadium, Amsterdam, 17–18 May 2014.
Winner: Tribe (Aus/Eng/Malta)

Centrale Sevens
Venue: Ecole Centrale Paris
Winner: Tribe (Aus/Eng/Malta)
Internationals: Brazil Development 15–5 Tunisia; Ukraine 12–19 Germany; Belgium 0–36 Germany; Ukraine 28–10 Belgium; Ukraine 5–14 Tunisia; Germany 24–19 Brazil Development; Belgium 0–40 Tunisia

European Championship Series: Top 12, Round 1
Venue: Moscow. 6–7 June 2013
Winner: 

European Championship: Group A
Venue: Bergen. 7–8 June 2014
Winner: 

European Championship Series: Top 12, Round 2
Venue: Brive. 14–15 June 2014
Winner: 

European Championship: Group B
Venue: Vilnius. 30 June 2014
Winner: 

Asian Championship Round 1
At: Hong Kong, 22–23 August 2014
Winner: 

IRB Women's Sevens World Series Qualifier
Venue: Shek Kip Mei Sports Ground, Hong Kong, 12–13 September 2014
 Winner: 

Group A

 52–7 
 31–0 
 45–0 
 35–0 
 33–7 
 19–5 

Group B

 19–21 
 44–0 
 66–0 
 31–7 
 26–7 
 36–0 

Plate Semi Finals (5th–8th)
 13–5 
 0–10 

7th/8th Match 
 7–31 

Plate final: 5th/6th Match 
 7–38 

Group C

 38–7 
 12–10 
 22–0 
 14–0 
 0–7 
 26–19 

Bowl Semi Finals (9th–12th)
 34–7 
 14–12 

11th/12th Match 
 0–55 

Bowl final:9th/10th Match 
 7–26 

Quarter-finals (1st–8th)
 28–7 
 45–7 
 21–12 
 7–22 

Cup Semi Finals (1st–4th)
 21–19 
 14–5 

3rd/4th place
 12–7 

Cup Final: 1st/2nd place
 24–19

European U18 Championship
Venue: Enkoping, Hong Kong, 13–14 September 2014
 Winner: 

Asian Games
At: Incheon, Korea, 30 September – 1 October 2014
Winner: 

Oceania Championship
At: Noose, Australia 4–5 October 2014
Winner: .

Asian Championship Round 2
At: Beijing, 18–19 October 2014
Winner: 

Valentine Martinez
Venue: Montevideo, Uruguay. 8–9 November 2014
Winner: 

Souston Sevens
At Souston, France, 15 November 2014

POOL 1

England Chariot 31 Spain 0
Ireland 33 Wales 7	
Wales 12 Spain 19
England Chariot 24 Ireland 5
Ireland 17 Spain 7
England Chariot bt Wales*

7th Place
Wales bt Tunisia

5th Place
Spain bt Spain B
POOL 2

England TW3 24 Spain B 0
France 46 Tunisia 0	
France 31 Spain B 0
Tunisia 0 England TW3 52
Tunisia 12 Spain B 17
France 14 England TW3 0

3rd Place
England TW3 38–7 Ireland

Final
France 19–17 England Chariots

2015

Mar del Plata Sevens
Venue: Mar del Plata, Argentina, 10–11 January 2015
This tournament also acted as South America's qualifier for the 2015 Pan American Games

Day One:
Pool A

Chile 12 Paraguay 10
Argentina 24 Paraguay 0
Argentina 41 Chile 5

Pool B

Colombia 36 Peru 0
Venezuela 10 Uruguay 5
Colombia 5 Venezuela 10
Uruguay 29 Peru 0
Colombia 12 Uruguay 7
Peru 12 Venezuela 26
Day Two:
Championship pool (top two qualify for PanAm)

Argentina 17 Colombia 0
Venezuela 10 Chile 0
Argentina 22 Chile 5
Venezuela 0 Colombia 12
Chile 0 Colombia 20
Argentina 22 Venezuela 5

5th/7th play-off pool

Paraguay 38 Peru 5
Paraguay 10 Uruguay 0
Uruguay 26 Peru 7

Women's Sevens World Series (Brazil)
Venue: São Paulo. 7–8 February 2015
Winner: 

Women's Sevens World Series (USA)
Venue: Atlanta. 14–15 March 2015
Winner: 

Women's Sevens World Series (Canada)
Venue: Langford. 18–19 April 2015
Winner: 

Pacific Games
Venue: Port Moresby, Papua New Guinea. 8–10 July 2015
Winner: 

Pan Am Games
Venue: Toronto, Ontario, Canada. 8–10 July 2015
Winner: 

IRB Women's Sevens World Series Qualifier
Venue: University College Dublin, 22–23 August 2015
 Winner: 
 Other core team qualifiers: , 

Group A

Brazil 10–19 Japan
Wales 33–12 Samoa
Wales 14–17 Japan
Brazil 42–5 Samoa
Japan 33–0 Samoa
Brazil 0–17 Wales

Group B

China 29–7 Kenya
Netherlands 33–0 Colombia
Netherlands 22–7 Kenya
China 26–0 Colombia
Kenya 12–7 Colombia 
China 10–22 Netherlands

Plate Semi Finals (5th–8th)
Hong Kong 14–10 China
Wales 5–10 Brazil

7th/8th Match 
China 7–29 Wales
Plate final: 5th/6th Match 
Hong Kong 0–17 Brazil

Group C

South Africa 33–5 Hong Kong
Ireland 64–0 Mexico
Ireland 50–0 Hong Kong
South Africa 38–0 Mexico
Hong Kong 48–0 Mexico
South Africa 17–5 Ireland
Bowl Semi Finals (9th–12th)
Kenya 31–0 Mexico
Colombia 12–5 Samoa
11th/12th Match 
Mexico 0–22 Samoa
Bowl final:9th/10th Match 
Kenya 5–0 Colombia
Quarter-finals (1st–8th)
South Africa 21–5 Hong Kong	
Ireland 27–5 China
Japan 17–0 Wales
Netherlands 12–10 Brazil
Cup Semi Finals (1st–4th)
South Africa 14–26 Ireland
Japan 10–5 Netherlands
3rd/4th place
South Africa 12–0 Netherlands
Cup Final: 1st/2nd place
Ireland 12–13 Japan

Elche Sevens
Venue: Elche, 23–24 March 2014
Winner: Great Britain

Day One
Great Britain 33–5 Spain
Portugal 12–19 Ireland
France 65–0 Alicante
Spain 50–0 Alicante
Ireland 07-26 Great Britain 
France 24–0 Portugal 
Spain 24–5 Ireland
Great Britain 12–19 France
Alicante 0–61 Portugal
Day Two
Alicante 78–0 Ireland
Spain 7–31 France 
Portugal 0–36 Great Britain
Ireland 0–12 France 
Spain 19–0 Portugal
Alicante 0–79 Great Britain
5th/6th place Portugal 55–0 Alicante
3rd/4th place Spain 12–5 Ireland
Final France 19–35 Great Britain

Women's Rugby Sevens rankings

 unofficial world rankings

Sources
The sources for each individual tournament entry are listed individually above.  Most of the information has come from the websites of various nations which has also been contributed to by news reports.  If only one source is listed then it should be considered the primary source. The listings are also checked by members of various rugby discussion fora.

External links
FIRA website

Notes

 
Rugby sevens-related lists
Rugby sevens competitions